Coleophora persana is a moth of the family Coleophoridae.

References

persana
Moths described in 1990